This is a list of the winners of the Bavarian Film Awards Prize for Best Film Score.

1987 Milan Bor
1990 Norbert Jürgen Schneider
1996 Niki Reiser
1997 Nicolette Krebitz, Katja Riemann, Jasmin Tabatabai
2007 Niki Reiser
2009 Konstantin Wecker
2012 Max Richter
2015 Gert Wilden junior
2019 Arash Safaian

References
https://www.stmd.bayern.de/wp-content/uploads/2020/08/Bayerische-Filmpreisträger-bis-2020.pdf

Bavarian film awards